(Spanish for "Royal") was a Spanish galley and the flagship of Don John of Austria in the Battle of Lepanto in 1571.

Construction 
 was built in Barcelona at the Royal Shipyard in 1568 and was the largest galley of its time.  was usually the designation of the flagship in a particular Spanish fleet and was not necessarily the actual name of the ship.

It was equipped with three heavy and six light artillery pieces, was propelled by a total of 290 rowers, and, in addition, carried some 400 sailors and soldiers at Lepanto. 50 men were posted on the upper deck of the forecastle, 50 on the midship ramp, another 50 each along the sides at the bow, 50 each on the skiff and oven platforms, 50 on the firing steps along the sides near the stern, and 50 more on the stern platform behind the huge battle flag. To help move and maneuver the huge ship, it was pushed from the rear during the battle by two other galleys.

Decoration
Befitting a royal flagship to be shown before Spain's former rivals of Venice and the Papacy, it was luxuriously ornamented and painted in the red and gold colors of Spain.  Its poop was elaborately carved and painted with numerous sculptures, bas-reliefs, paintings, and other embellishments, most of them evoking religious and humanistic inspirational themes.
Giovanni Battista Castello  did the first sketch for the decoration under the orders of Francisco Hurtado de Mendoza, Count of Monteagudo.
After his death in 1569, the humanist Juan de Mal de Lara developed the program.
In Seville, the decoration was performed by the sculptor Juan Bautista Vázquez and the architect Benvenuto Tortello.
Mal de Lara's program featured Hercules, Betis (the personification of the river Guadalquivir), Jason and the Argonauts, personifications of virtues, and other mythological allegories alluding to and advising John of Austria as captain for his half-brother Philip II of Spain.

Naval service 
The Battle of Lepanto in 1571 saw Juan of Austria's fleet of the Holy League, an alliance of Christian powers of the Mediterranean, decisively defeat an Ottoman fleet under Grand Admiral Müezzinzade Ali Pasha.

 and the Turkish galley , Ali Pasha's flagship, engaged in direct deck-to-deck combat very soon after the start of the battle.  was boarded and after about one hour of bloody fighting, with reinforcements being supplied to both ships by supporting galleys of the two respective fleets, captured. Ali Pasha was wounded by musket fire, fell to the deck, and was beheaded by a Spanish soldier. His head was displayed on a pike, severely affecting the morale of his troops.  captured the "Great Flag of the Caliphs" and became a symbol of the victory at Lepanto.

Legacy 

Gallery

See also 

 Mendam Berahi, a Malay flagship galley.
 La Réale, a French flagship galley.
 Tarihi Kadırga, a surviving Ottoman galley.

References

Further reading 
 
 

Ships of the Spanish Navy
Naval ships of Spain
Ships built in Spain
Battle of Lepanto
16th-century ships
1568 in Spain
1568 works
1568 in military history
Galleys